Holiday's End is a 1937 British mystery film directed by John Paddy Carstairs and starring Sally Stewart, Rosalyn Boulter and Wally Patch. The film follows the arrival at boarding school of a boy king.

It was made at Pinewood Studios as a quota quickie.

Plot
When the boy monarch of an East European state arrives at an English boarding school, a science master is found murdered. Suspicion falls on everyone, until the killer is exposed as a revolutionary, attempting to depose the young king.

Cast
 Wally Patch as Sergeant Yerbury 
 Sally Stewart as Betty Sulgrave 
 Kenneth Buckley as Arthur Marsh 
 Rosalyn Boulter as Joyce Deane 
 Aubrey Mallalieu as Bellamy 
 Leslie Bradley as Peter Hurst 
 Beckett Bould as Philpotts 
 Robert Field as Des Voeux 
 Henry Victor as Major Zwanenberg 
 Denis Cowles as Superintendent of Police  
 Bruce Moir as Perks

References

Bibliography
 Chibnall, Steve. Quota Quickies: The Birth of the British 'B' Film. British Film Institute, 2007.
 Low, Rachael. Filmmaking in 1930s Britain. George Allen & Unwin, 1985.
 Wood, Linda. British Films, 1927-1939. British Film Institute, 1986.

External links

1937 films
British mystery films
1937 mystery films
Films directed by John Paddy Carstairs
Films shot at Pinewood Studios
Films produced by Anthony Havelock-Allan
Quota quickies
Films set in England
British black-and-white films
British and Dominions Studios films
1930s English-language films
1930s British films